The  ("Orange Flag") is a recognition of quality awarded by the Touring Club Italiano to small towns (population 15,000 or less) in Italy for excellency in tourism, hospitality and the environment.

This recognition was established in 1998 in Liguria, in response to a regional institution's demand to foster and promote the Italian hinterland. Later the recognition was adopted on nationwide scale to identify sites of excellence in all regions of Italy.

This is the only Italian project of its kind to be listed by the World Tourism Organization among successful programs for the sustainable development of tourism around the world.

Goals 
use of local resources;
culture of hospitality;
fostering of local crafting and products;
encouragement of local entrepreneurship;
strengthening of the territorial identity.

External links 
official website flags of the Italian Touring Club
official website of the Association of Orange Flag Countries

Italian culture
Tourism in Italy